Miitta Sorvali (born 10 February 1956 in Kitee) is a Finnish theatre, film and television actress.  Sorvali's film credits include film credits include Aurora andPohjanmaa. She had a part in The Winter War.  Her television credits include Röyhkeä diplomaatti, Miitta-täti and Sipoon herttua.

Sorvali is married to Finnish actor Kari Sorvali.

References

External links

1956 births
Living people
Finnish film actresses
Finnish television actresses
People from Kitee